Richard Hunn (1949–2006) had the lay-Buddhist name of Upasaka Wen Shu. He was the disciple of Charles Luk (1898–1978) and practiced Chan Buddhism, as taught to Charles Luk by the Chinese Buddhist master Hsu Yun (虛雲, 1840–1959).

Buddhist translations

Richard Hunn edited the English translation of the Chinese text of the autobiography of Hsu Yun in 1987, which was subsequently published through Element Books in 1988. He expanded on the original translation by Charles Luk, comparing the English text to the Chinese original, editing and making revisions where required. He also added extra notes, a glossary and the use of modern pinyin.  Several passages were rewritten or added, constituting new translations.

Richard Hunn had this to say about the project:

Teaching activity
In 1990, Richard Hunn relocated to Lancashire to further his academic studies within the field of Chinese Buddhism. Prior to this however, he spent many years living in Thorpe Hamlet, where he served as an authority on Chan Buddhism. His knowledge and expertise were focused through the Norwich Ch’an Association – a loose affiliation of like minded people dedicated to spiritual practice.  People would visit from the UK or from abroad seeking Chan instruction and every so often, Richard Hunn would hold "Ch’an Weeks", intensive meditational retreats that could last from between two days to two weeks. This is an ancient tradition dating back to Song China (960–1279) that recognises the importance of the laity and lay practice within Chan Buddhism and follows the "enlightened lay-person" example of Vimalakirti.

Another crucial and important part of Richard Hunn's Chan teaching method evolved around the tradition of instruction by letter-writing.  This involves the ability to use words in such away so as to affect change in the mind of the reader. It is a tradition exemplified by the Song master Dahui Zonggao (1089–1163) who, whilst living in remote hills, nevertheless kept up a wide Chan dialogue through the Song postal service.

During this time period, Richard Hunn also wrote reviews for the Middle Way, the journal of the Buddhist Society of the UK. He concentrated on newly published works of the Buddhist genre, but also commented on books within his own particular areas of expertise: Chinese philosophy, Buddhism, Daoism and Confucianism. His particular specialism was the Yijing and its various derivatives and works of influence. Richard Hunn spent much of the later years of his life working upon his own translation of the Yijing. The work was unpublished due to his death from cancer, but a sampler of the book went down well at the Frankfurt book-fair.

The Yijing was being translated while he was researching another book entitled Zen In China: The Roots of Tradition (Element Books).  This research eventually led to Richard Hunn relocating to Kyoto, Japan in 1991 to further his studies.  He spent the remaining fifteen years of his life happily in Japan where he remarried. He continued his research whilst teaching English to Japanese students, bringing groups of his students to the UK as part of an exchange programme. Richard Hunn and his wife would practice Kyudo (弓道-Japanese archery), and continued to do so up until he was diagnosed with cancer in 2005.  Richard Hunn died on 1 October 2006 at the age of 57 years.

Richard Hunn dedicated his life to the preservation of the English translations of Chinese Buddhist texts created by his teacher, Charles Luk, for whom he wrote an obituary in 1980.  Charles Luk was given the task of translating key Buddhist texts into English by Xu Yun. Today, this essential work is continued through the website Richard Hunn Association for Ch’an Study. Founded by Richard Hunn in 2004 during one of his visits to the UK, it continues to grow through the guidance of Richard Hunn's Chan students in the UK. The current custodian of the website trained with Richard Hunn over a seventeen-year period and has an archive of written material to draw from, written by Richard Hunn over that time period.

To this end Richard Hunn advocated a broad appeal coupled with the exactness of study. He always dedicated his work to Master Xu Yun and Charles Luk. In recent years, work inspired by Richard Hunn has continued with the translation of Chinese texts relating to Chan masters who have lived into the modern age. These translations have been placed on the Richard Hunn Association for Ch'an Study free for all to read. This on-going translation project has been extensively assisted by Upasika Sheng Hua and Upasika Yukyern, and now includes vital technical and interpretive input from Chinese sources.

The obituary for Richard Hunn was written by his British disciple Adrian Chan-Wyles and appears in the Buddhist Society's Journal The Middle Way. Adrian Chan-Wyles is the custodian of the Richard Hunn Association for Ch'an Study, and continues this lineage.

In May 2013 the Richard Hunn Association for Ch’an Study, became the founding member of the International Ch'an Buddhism Institute (ICBI), which incorporates the Ch'an Guild of Hui Neng (CGHN).

Daniel Scharpenburg, a Dharma teacher authorized to teach by Adrian Chan-Wyles in 2014, also continues the Chan teaching lineage of Richard Hunn and Charles Luk in America. While Luis Lista, a Dharma teacher authorized to teach by Adrian Chan-Wyles in 2020, continues the lineage in Belgium.

References

External links
 Richard Hunn Association for Ch'an Study
 International Ch'an Buddhism Institute
 RHACS - forum
 Ch'an Guild of Hui Neng
 The Buddhist Society
 Western Ch'an Fellowship
 Charles Luk's Obituary (by Richard Hunn)
 Richard Hunn's Obituary (by A Wyles)
 Biography of Master Xu Yun (by A Wyles)
 Biography of Cen Xue Lu (by A Wyles)
 Biography of Charles Luk (by A Wyles)
 Biography of Richard Hunn (by A Wyles)

1949 births
2006 deaths
British Buddhists
People from Thorpe Hamlet